The 1988 ANAPROF (also known as the Bayer Cup) for sponsorship reasons, is the 1st season of the ANAPROF, now known as Liga Panameña de Fútbol, the top-flight football in Panama. The season began on 26 February 1988 and ended in 21 August 1988. Six teams started the season, Chirilanco FC folded after one game.

Teams

Facts 
 First game 1-1 draw between C.D. Plaza Amador vs Tauro FC
 First scorer Carlos Maldonado from C.D. Plaza Amador
 First penalty awarded to Tauro FC and scored by Virgilio Reid

References 

ANAPROF seasons